Sabina K. is a Bosnian-language feature film written and directed by Cristobal Krusen which premiered at the Sarajevo Film Festival in 2015. It is inspired by a true story in the aftermath of the war in Bosnia and Herzegovina in the 12 months beginning January 2004.

Logline
Sabina, a divorced mother of two small children, falls in love with an old friend from the Bosnian war. The two plan to marry, but things go terribly wrong.

Short Synopsis
The film follows Sabina, a divorced Muslim woman, and Saša, a Catholic man. The two meet, fall in love, and become engaged, however the society around them is not overly favorable towards their relationship, as they live in post-war Bosnia. Their only true champion is Ankica, whose son was killed in the war and who offers to host a wedding for them on the island of Korčula. In the spring Sabina travels to the island and awaits Saša's arrival, only for the man to never appear. She travels home, where she discovers that Saša has moved out of their shared apartment without explanation. Weeks pass and Sabina discovers she's pregnant. Her friends and family pressure her to get an abortion, which she refuses to get. Her life grows progressively worse until she's left homeless and jobless.

Long Synopsis
Sabina K. is inspired by a true story set in Bosnia and Herzegovina. The "Sabina" of the title plans to marry Saša (with whom she served during the Bosnian War), but there is a problem. Sabina is Muslim and Saša a Catholic, and their respective families disapprove of the marriage. Their only ally is an older woman, Ankica, whose son - killed in the war - had been their close friend. "Aunt" Ankica thinks of Sabina and Saša as her own children and invites them to her home on the island of Korčula to get married. 

Springtime comes and Sabina travels to Korčula where she is reunited with Ankica and where the two women wait for Saša to join them from Zagreb. The days pass... Saša never arrives... and with a heavy and troubled heart, Sabina returns to Sarajevo. She discovers that Saša has taken all his things from her apartment and moved out. There is no note; no explanation. Sabina goes to Saša's mother for answers, but the deeply embittered woman treats her harshly and calls the police. Mysteriously, inexplicably, the love of Sabina's life is gone and she doesn't know where or why. 

A few weeks later, Sabina passes out on the job. She goes to the doctor and learns that she is pregnant. Her parents and friends counsel her to have an abortion and put the past behind her, but she refuses. As her pregnancy advances and winter approaches, Sabina loses her job and when her ex-husband tries to shake her down for money by threatening to take the children away permanently, she comes to a breaking point. Love has failed her, and she decides to take her life. 

The suicide attempt is unsuccessful and Sabina spends several days in the hospital. While there, she is visited by her landlady, who informs her that since her lease will end in another week, she has decided to rent out Sabina's apartment to another family. Feeling abandoned by family and friends, and with no help from social services, Sabina wanders the streets of Sarajevo in the bitter cold of winter. There are no solutions... there is no refuge... and Sabina again makes plans to take her life. She sells the last of her jewelry and surreptitiously buys three times the amount of sleeping pills used in her previous suicide attempt. She checks into a room at a motel and begins swallowing the pills, slipping into unconsciousness. 

What happens next is subject to opinion... But one thing becomes clear. Sabina will never be the same.

Reception 
The Australian Christian Channel wrote a favorable review for the movie, stating that "Sabina K is an impacting, must-see film which journeys through a road of emptiness to reveal the treasures of what matters most."

References

External links
 
 

Bosnia and Herzegovina war drama films
2015 films
2015 war drama films